The Compton Névé is a névé in the Pacific Ranges of the Coast Mountains in southwestern British Columbia, Canada, located southeast of the Homathko Icefield and Mount Gilbert and to the south of the Bishop River.

References

Glaciers of the Pacific Ranges
Ice fields of British Columbia
Névés